Xiang Jinwu (born February 1964) is a Chinese engineer and professor at Beihang University.

Biography
Xiang was born in Pingjiang County, Hunan, in February 1964. He secondary studied at Xiangyin No.1 High School. After graduating from Nanjing University of Aeronautics and Astronautics in 1984, he became a designer at China Helicopter Design and Research Institute. He received his master's degree in mechanics from Northwestern Polytechnical University in 1990 and doctor's degree from Nanjing University of Aeronautics and Astronautics in 1993, respectively. he was a postdoctoral fellow at Nanjing University of Aeronautics and Astronautics between 1993 and 1995.

He joined the faculty of Beihang University in 1995.

Contribution
He was the chief designer of  Long Eagle nmanned aerial vehicle (UAV).

Honours and awards
 2006 State Science and Technology Progress Award (Second Class)
 2008 State Science and Technology Progress Award (First Class)
 2010 Industrial Innovation Award of the Ho Leung Ho Lee Foundation 
 2017 State Science and Technology Progress Award (First Class)
 April 28, 2018, National Labor Medal
 November 22, 2019 Member of the Chinese Academy of Engineering (CAE)

References

1964 births
Living people
People from Pingjiang County
Engineers from Hunan
Northwestern Polytechnical University alumni
Nanjing University of Aeronautics and Astronautics alumni
Academic staff of Nanjing University of Aeronautics and Astronautics
Members of the Chinese Academy of Engineering